Rafael Armando Viotti (born February 15, 1988 in Buenos Aires, Argentina) is an Argentine professional footballer who plays as a midfielder for C.D. Cuenca of the Liga Pro Ecuador in Ecuador.

Teams
  Argentinos Juniors 2006–2009
  Aldosivi de Mar del Plata 2009–2010
  San Telmo 2011–2012
  Tristán Suárez 2013–2014
  San Luis de Quillota 2014–2015
  Everton de Viña del Mar 2015–2016
  Deportes La Serena 2016–2017
  Unión La Calera 2017
  Santiago Wanderers 2018
  Cobreloa 2019
  Deportivo Cuenca 2020

References
 
 

1988 births
Living people
Argentine footballers
Association football midfielders
Primera B de Chile players
Ecuadorian Serie A players
Argentinos Juniors footballers
Aldosivi footballers
San Telmo footballers
CSyD Tristán Suárez footballers
San Luis de Quillota footballers
Everton de Viña del Mar footballers
Deportes La Serena footballers
Unión La Calera footballers
Santiago Wanderers footballers
Cobreloa footballers
C.D. Cuenca footballers
Argentine expatriate sportspeople in Chile
Expatriate footballers in Chile
Argentine expatriate sportspeople in Ecuador
Expatriate footballers in Ecuador
Footballers from Buenos Aires